Alex Myers (born c.1979) is an American author, educator and transgender rights activist.

Early life and education
Myers was born in Paris, Maine. As a teenager, he attended Phillips Exeter Academy in New Hampshire. He obtained a bachelor's degree from Harvard University, where he studied near Eastern languages and civilizations. While at Harvard he worked to have gender identity added to the school's nondiscrimination clause. Myers obtained an MA in religion from Brown University. He later studied fine arts at the Vermont College of Fine Arts.

Career
Myers teaches English at Phillips Exeter Academy. His first book Revolutionary was released in 2014. Based on the life of Deborah Sampson, the focus of the novel is a woman who disguises herself as a man in order to fight in the American Revolutionary War. Released in 2019, his novel Continental Divide follows Ron Bancroft who grows up as a tomboy, comes out as a teenager and travels west to find himself. In an interview with New Hampshire Public Radio Myers discussed how his own experience with transitioning was reflected in the main character Ron in his novel Continental Divide explaining: "The parallels in my own life would be a rural childhood, a feeling of always being a boy despite society telling me that I was a girl, and then going off to a more urban college experience with a bit more exposure to a range of differences." Myers' third book The Story of Silence  (2020) is a retelling of Le Roman de Silence.

Personal life
Myers is a transgender man. He began transitioning in 1995 during his senior year at Phillips Exeter Academy. Having studied the first three years as a woman,  he returned to campus senior year with his hair cut and requested that he be called Alex. The transition made him the first openly transgender student in the school's history.

Publications

Novels

 Revolutionary (2014)
 Continental Divide (2019)
 The Story of Silence (2020)

Non-fiction

 Supporting Transgender Students: Understanding Gender Identity and Reshaping School Culture (2021)

Articles

References

Living people
LGBT people from Maine
Transgender men
Harvard University alumni
Brown University alumni
Transgender writers
People from Paris, Maine
Phillips Exeter Academy alumni
Year of birth missing (living people)
Writers from Maine
American LGBT rights activists
21st-century American novelists
Activists from Maine
Phillips Exeter Academy faculty